Edward Elbert Ambrose (April 13, 1894 – June 8, 1994) was an American jockey in Thoroughbred horse racing. In the 1910s and 1920s he rode for top owners such as Harry Payne Whitney, Willis Sharpe Kilmer, and Walter M. Jeffords.

During his career Ambrose had four mounts in the Kentucky Derby and seven in the Preakness Stakes with his best result in both aboard Toro when he finished third in the 1928 Derby and second in the 1928 Preakness for owner Edward B. McLean, publisher of The Washington Post. Among his best mounts was Wildair with whom he won the 1920 Metropolitan Handicap and ran third in the 1920 Preakness and Prudery, considered in retrospect as the American Champion Two and Three-Year-Old, Filly.

In a famous 1920 edition of the Dwyer Stakes involving just two entrants, Ambrose rode John P. Grier to a strong second-place finish against Man o' War.

Ambrose lived to be 100. He was a resident of Towson, Maryland at the time of his death in 1994.

References

 Ours, Dorothy. Man o' War: A Legend Like Lightning (2006) St. Martin's Press 

1894 births
1994 deaths
American centenarians
American jockeys
Men centenarians
Sportspeople from St. Louis
19th-century American people
20th-century American people